Hanover Shoe in Hanover, Pennsylvania, was once one of the largest and most successful shoe companies in York County, Pennsylvania.

History
Harper Donelson Sheppard was born in Pitt County, North Carolina, on October 9, 1868, the 13th of 15 children. Sheppard then entered into a financial partnership with C.N. Myers, and together they established the Hanover Shoe on December 26, 1899, with a common vision: sell the best shoes possible for one price, $2.50 a pair, and eliminate the middle-man by selling directly to the public. They opened their first store in York in June 1900; within fifteen years the Hanover Shoe Company had 61 stores from Indianapolis to New York City.

The two men were also responsible for financing or operating such ventures as the Hanover General Hospital, the Evening Sun, the public waterworks and two impounding dams, the local athletic field and the Hanover Shoe Farms, today the largest standardbred nursery in the world.

In 1966, the Hanover Shoe Company opened a manufacturing facility in Franklin, West Virginia & Marlinton, West Virginia, and contracted shoe orders for Bostonian and JC Penney and made shoes for their own Hanover brand. In 1978, C&J Clark purchased the Hanover Shoe Company and moved their North American headquarters to Hanover, Pennsylvania. The company moved all operations to West Virginia in 1996 because of cheaper taxes. The original Hanover Shoe building on Carlisle Street in Hanover, Pennsylvania, was converted to residential apartments in 2001, after sitting abandoned since the 1970s. The power plant is now a museum for the Hanover Fire Department.

A Hanover Shoe retailer remains in Hanover, Pennsylvania, but its shoes are manufactured outside of the United States.

Horween Leather Company in Chicago supplies leather shells for footwear to Hanover Shoe.

See also
Hanover Shoe Farms
Hanover, Pennsylvania

References

External links
Hanover Shoe Company - a website dedicated to the Hanover Shoe - History, past & present photos, timeline, & more.

Hanover, Pennsylvania
Buildings and structures in York County, Pennsylvania
Companies based in York County, Pennsylvania
Shoe companies of the United States
American companies established in 1899
1899 establishments in Pennsylvania
Manufacturing companies based in Pennsylvania